Ambar Crúz (born January 2, 2001), better known by her stage name Ambar Lucid, or Estrella, is an American singer-songwriter and musician from the suburb of Little Ferry, New Jersey.

Life and career
Cruz was born to a Dominican mother and Mexican father. She spent two years, between ages 5 and 7, moving between the Dominican Republic and New Jersey until finally settling in New Jersey. As a child, her father was deported to Mexico, and she did not see him again until they were reunited in 2019 when she was 18 years old. She also met her little sister for the first time. The documentary Llegaron Las Flores was created to capture the experience of separation and reuniting with family. She remains an advocate for immigrant rights, having also performed at the "Selena For Sanctuary" concert in 2019 in New York, which raised money for immigrant advocacy groups. The documentary was released the same week more ICE raids were announced in multiple large cities.

She started singing at the age of 5, and started by posting song covers on YouTube. She is completely self-taught on the piano, guitar, and ukulele and used YouTube videos as guidance for vocal technique. She dropped out of high school before her senior year to move to Los Angeles and pursue music. She released her debut album Garden of Lucid in 2020 and an EP, Dreaming Lucid, in 2019. Her lyrics include Spanish and English, about which she has been quoted saying, "If one day I decided, 'Listen, I’ma sing all in Spanish,' it would be fine. If I write songs that don’t have any Spanish in them, it would be fine. It feels really good to prove the person that said ['no one’s gonna pay attention to your music if you sing in Spanish'] wrong, just because it was such a hurtful thing to hear as a child with such a big dream."

She has cited Alice Phoebe Lou, Willow Smith, and Kali Uchis as inspirations for her songwriting, and notes peers Omar Apollo and Cuco as the new generation of young Latino artists whose music speaks to immigrant kids. In 2019, she announced she was going on tour with Omar Apollo. As of September 2021, she has amassed over 650,000 monthly listeners on Spotify.

Discography

Albums 

 Garden of Lucid (2020)

EPs 

 Get Lost In The Music (2021)
 Dreaming Lucid (2019)

Singles 

 "Timeless" (2022)
 "Timeless - A COLORS SHOW" (2022)
 "La Torre" (2022)
 "girl ur so pretty" (2022)
 "Dead Leaves" (2022)
 "Lizard (Alternate Version) - Spotify Singles" (2021)
 "Ambar Bossa Nova - Spotify Singles" (2021)
 "Get Lost In The Music" (2021)
 "Lolita" (2020)
 "Head Down" (2020)
 "Garden (Sir Sly Remix)" (2020)
 "Questioning My Mind (Joey Pecoraro Remix)" (2020)
 "Fantasmas (Felly Remix)" (2020)
 "Universe (IHF Remix)" (2020)
 "A Letter to My Younger Self (Sarcastic Sounds Remix)" (2020)
 "Story to Tell" (2020)
 "Fantasmas" (2020)
 "Garden" (2019)
 "Questioning My Mind" (2019)
 "Mar de Llanto" (2019)
 "Candy" (2018)
 "Listen" (2018)
 "Eyes" (2018)
 "A letter to my younger self" (2018)

References

External links
 

2001 births
Living people
Musicians from New Jersey
21st-century American singers
21st-century American women singers
American pop musicians
American contemporary R&B singers
American alternative rock musicians
American musicians of Mexican descent
American singers of Dominican Republic descent
Spanish-language singers
People from Little Ferry, New Jersey
Hispanic and Latino American women singers